Eslamabad-e Sofla (also Romanized as Eslāmābād-e Soflá; also known as Kangareh Shāh-e Soflá, Kangarshāh, Kangar Shāh, Kangar Shāh-e Pā’īn, Kangar Shāh-e Soflá, and Kangarshāh Pāīn) is a village in Khodabandehlu Rural District, in the Central District of Sahneh County, Kermanshah Province, Iran. At the 2006 census, its population was 598, in 162 families.

References 

Populated places in Sahneh County